Stocksfield, formerly Broomley and Stocksfield is a civil parish in Northumberland, England. At the 2001 census, the parish, which includes the village of Stocksfield, along with the hamlets of Apperley Dene, Branch End, Broomley, Hindley, New Ridley and Painshawfield, had a population of 3,039, falling slightly to 3,011 at the 2011 Census.

On 11 January 2019 the name of the parish was officially changed to Stocksfield, to reflect developments in the area and changes in population over the years. On 1 April 1955 the parish was renamed from "Broomley" to "Broomley and Stocksfield".

Governance 
Stocksfield is in the parliamentary constituency of Hexham. The appropriate electoral ward is Stocksfield and Broomhaugh. The total population of this ward at the 2011 Census is 4,799.

References

External links

Civil parishes in Northumberland